In pathology, apyrexy, or apyrexia (Greek , from α-, privative, to be in a fever, fire, fever) is the normal interval or period of intermission in a fever. Also, the absence of a fever.

References 

Fever